The 1947 season was the 17th completed season of Finnish Football League Championship, which culminated in a play-off group comprising the winners and runners-up of the Palloliiton league and the Työväen Urheiluliiton league.  The two top teams finished on equal points and met again in a play-off to determine the winners of the championship.

Championship play-off

HIFK Helsinki 2–3 TuTo Turku
KTP Kotka 4–2 TuTo Turku
VIFK Vaasa 1–5 HIFK Helsinki
TuTo Turku 2–0 VIFK Vaasa
KTP Kotka 1–4 VIFK Vaasa
HIFK Helsinki 3–1 KTP Kotka

Final
HIFK Helsinki 3–2 TuTo Turku

References
Finland - List of final tables (RSSSF)

Mestaruussarja seasons
Fin
Fin
1